In the karate events at the 2001 Mediterranean Games in Tunis, the Open men's competition was won by Konstantinos Papadopoulos of Greece, and the Open women's competition by Yıldız Aras of Turkey. France came top of the medals table, with 5 gold medals.

Medallists

Men's competition

Women's competition

Medal table

References
 Complete 2001 Mediterranean Games Standings

Sports at the 2001 Mediterranean Games
2001
2001 in karate